A Lanterna was an anarchist periodical founded by Benjamim Mota whose main theme was anti-clericalism, published in Brazil at the beginning of the 20th century in three distinct phases, directed by Benjamim Mota from 1901 to 1904, by Edgard Leuenroth from 1909 to 1916 and from 1933 to 1935. José Oiticica published his first anarchist text in it.

References

1901 establishments in Brazil
1935 disestablishments in Brazil
Anarchist periodicals published in Brazil
Defunct newspapers published in Brazil
Portuguese-language newspapers
Publications established in 1901
Publications disestablished in 1935